Victor Mitchell (October 21, 1923 – January 5, 1995) was an American bridge player. He was married to Jacqui Mitchell. He was inducted into the American Contract Bridge League's Hall of Fame in 1996.

Bridge accomplishments

Honors

 ACBL Hall of Fame 1996 
 ACBL Honorary Member 1988

Wins

 North American Bridge Championships (6)
 Mitchell Board-a-Match Teams (2) 1962, 1963 
 Nail Life Master Open Pairs (1) 1962 
 Spingold (2) 1956, 1959 
 von Zedtwitz Life Master Pairs (1) 1965

Runners-up

 World Olympiad Teams Championship (1) 1964
 North American Bridge Championships (10)
 Mitchell Board-a-Match Teams (2) 1965, 1988 
 Chicago Mixed Board-a-Match (1) 1989 
 Nail Life Master Open Pairs (1) 1965 
 Reisinger (1) 1955 
 Spingold (1) 1969 
 Vanderbilt (1) 1969 
 Wernher Open Pairs (1) 1955 
 von Zedtwitz Life Master Pairs (2) 1954, 1955

Notes

External links
 
 

1923 births
1995 deaths
American contract bridge players